Kalcheh (also Romanized as Kal Chāh; also known as Gol Chāh) is a village in Shusef Rural District, Shusef District, Nehbandan County, South Khorasan Province, Iran. At the 2006 census, its population was 40, in 10 families.

References 

Populated places in Nehbandan County